The Linton-Smith Nunataks are a group of nunataks between Jennings Promontory and the Reinbolt Hills on the east side of the Amery Ice Shelf, Antarctica. They were first photographed by U.S. Navy Operation Highjump (1946–47), and the position was fixed by intersection from the Corry Rocks and Rubeli Bluff by Australian National Antarctic Research Expeditions (ANARE) surveyors in 1968. The group was named by the Antarctic Names Committee of Australia for N. Linton-Smith, senior technical officer with the Antarctic Division, Melbourne, a member of the ANARE Amery Ice Shelf glaciological traverse in 1970.

References

Nunataks of Princess Elizabeth Land
Ingrid Christensen Coast